Ian Van Dahl was a Belgian progressive house, electro house, and deep house music project, created by Christophe Chantzis and Erik Vanspauwen, with first singer Martine Theeuwen (aka Marsha), who also co-wrote and sang the song "Castles in the Sky". Cindy Mertens was the second singer and can be seen in the videoclip from Castles in the Sky. Her vocal contribution was limited to live performances only. In 2001 she was replaced by Annemie Coenen, who would become front singer of the project.

History 

The name Ian van Dahl is derived from the names Jan Vandaal (Average Joe) and Roald Dahl. 

The project's first single was "Castles in the Sky", with lyrics co-written and vocals performed by Martine Theeuwen. The single never became a major hit in Belgium but did very well in the European clubscene. With popularity peaking in party locations like Ibiza where the single got massive support from dj´s like Tiesto and Armin van Buuren. This all led to the record being picked up by Dave Pearce, BBC Radio 1 DJ, and owner of the English dance label Nulife. Many other countries followed and Castles in the Sky got licensed to over 65 countries with labels like Robbins Entertainment in the US and Central Station in Australia. 

Thanks to the huge amount of radio airplay and DJ support, Castles in the Sky became a big hit in many countries around the world. Reaching No.3 on the UK Singles Chart while also spending seven weeks in the top 10 in the summer of 2001. The single had also managed to crossover onto the American Charts and reached the Billboard Hot 100 where it peaked at No.91. Until today Castles in the Sky is still being played, remixed and covered by dj´s all over the world. A remake of Castles in the Sky was the last release from i_o ,on Armada Music in 2020, just before he passed away. In 2021, 20 years after the original release, Castles in the Sky reached platinum status in the United Kingdom with sales surpassing 600 000 copies.

The follow-up singles, recorded with Annemie Coenen, became major hits on the UK singles charts as well. The single "Will I?" peaked at No.5,  "Reason" at No.8 and "Try" at No.15. The Ace album reached No.7 in the UK where it achieved Gold status. 

Ace is an acronym for Annemie, Christophe and Erik. The 3 members of the band. The single Castles in the Sky was the biggest selling dance single of the year in the UK. The album Ace became the biggest selling dance album of the year in the UK. A unique achievement for a Belgian band. 

In 2004, recordings of the second album Lost & Found began with Belgian producers Peter Luts and David Vervoort joining Christophe Chantzis and Erik Vanspauwen for the production of this album. The album singles "I Can't Let You Go," "Believe," "Where Are You Now?" and "Inspiration" were all successful, but failed to match the massive commercial sales of the previous singles from the first album. With two final singles "Movin On" and "Just a Girl" being released in 2005 and 2006.

In 2008 Annemie Coenen decided to leave Ian van Dahl and start her own solo project AnnaGrace  

Christophe Chantzis, creator of the act and writer of the hits, is still touring the world performing as a DJ.

Discography

Albums

Singles

References

Belgian Eurodance groups
Robbins Entertainment artists
Belgian trance music groups
Belgian musical duos
Male–female musical duos
Electronic dance music duos